The 2014 IIHF Women's World Championship Division II was an ice hockey competition consisting of three tournaments. The Division II Group A tournament was played in Asiago, Italy, from 6 to 12 April 2014. The Division II Group B was played from 24 to 30 March 2014 in Reykjavík, Iceland. The qualification tournament was held in Mexico City, Mexico, from 19 to 22 March 2014. The winners of Division II Group A were promoted to the Division I Group B for the 2015 championship, while the last-placed team was relegated to the Division II Group B. The Group B winners moved up to Group A, while the last placed team was relegated to the 2015 Division II Group B Qualification. The winners of the qualification were promoted to the Division II Group B for the next year's championship. Divisions II A, II B and II B-Q represent the fourth, the fifth and the sixth tier of the IIHF World Women's Championships.

Division II Group A

Final standings

Results
All times are local (UTC+2).

Awards and statistics

Awards
Best players selected by the directorate:
 Best Goalkeeper:  Shin So-Jung
 Best Defenseman:  Valentina Bettarini
 Best Forward:  Karolina Pozniewska
Source: IIHF.com

Scoring leaders
List shows the top skaters sorted by points, then goals.

GP = Games played; G = Goals; A = Assists; Pts = Points; +/− = Plus/minus; PIM = Penalties in minutes; POS = PositionSource: IIHF.com

Leading goaltenders
Only the top five goaltenders, based on save percentage, who have played at least 40% of their team's minutes, are included in this list.
TOI = Time on ice (minutes:seconds); SA = Shots against; GA = Goals against; GAA = Goals against average; Sv% = Save percentage; SO = ShutoutsSource: IIHF.com

Division II Group B

Final standings

Results
All times are local (UTC±0).

Awards and statistics

Awards
Best players selected by the directorate:
 Best Goalkeeper:  Sera Doğramacı
 Best Defenseman:  Diana Kruselj Posaveć
 Best Forward:  Pia Pren
Source: IIHF.com

Scoring leaders
List shows the top skaters sorted by points, then goals.

GP = Games played; G = Goals; A = Assists; Pts = Points; +/− = Plus/minus; PIM = Penalties in minutes; POS = PositionSource: IIHF.com

Leading goaltenders
Only the top five goaltenders, based on save percentage, who have played at least 40% of their team's minutes, are included in this list.
TOI = Time on ice (minutes:seconds); SA = Shots against; GA = Goals against; GAA = Goals against average; Sv% = Save percentage; SO = ShutoutsSource: IIHF.com

Division II Group B Qualification

Final standings

Results
All times are local (UTC−6).

References

External links
 Official website of IIHF

II
2014
2014 IIHF Women's World Championship Division I
2014 IIHF Women's World Championship Division I
IIHF Women's World Championship Division I|IIHF Women's World Championship Division I
IIHF Women's World Championship Division I
IIHF Women's World Championship Division I
Sports competitions in Reykjavík
Sports competitions in Mexico City
Sport in Veneto
IIHF Women's World Championship Division II
Women's ice hockey competitions in Italy
March 2014 sports events in Europe
April 2014 sports events in Europe
March 2014 sports events in Mexico
April 2014 sports events in Mexico
2010s in Mexico City
2010s in Reykjavík